The word joy refers to the emotion evoked by well-being, success, or good fortune, and is typically associated with feelings of intense, long lasting happiness.

Dictionary definitions
Dictionary definitions of joy typically include a sense of it being a reaction to an external happening, e.g. a physical sensation experienced, or receiving good news.

Distinction vs similar states
 saw a clear distinction between joy, pleasure, and happiness: "I sometimes wonder whether all pleasures are not substitutes for Joy", and "I call it Joy, which is here a technical term and must be sharply distinguished both from Happiness and Pleasure. Joy (in my sense) has indeed one characteristic, and one only, in common with them; the fact that anyone who has experienced it will want it again... I doubt whether anyone who has tasted it would ever, if both were in his power, exchange it for all the pleasures in the world. But then Joy is never in our power and Pleasure often is."

Michela Summa says that the distinction between joy and happiness is that, "Joy accompanies the process through and through, whereas happiness seems to be more strictly tied to the moment of achievement of the process... joy is not only a direct emotional response to an event that is embedded in our life-concerns but is also tightly bound to the present moment, whereas happiness presupposes an evaluative stance concerning one period of one’s life or one’s own life as a whole."

Causes
The causes of joy have been ascribed to various sources.

"When the mind is pure, joy follows like a shadow that never leaves.” - Gautama Buddha,

"[Joy is] the emotional dimension of the good life, of a life that is both going well and is being lived well." - Miroslav Volf

"This is the true joy in life, the being used for a purpose recognized by yourself as a mighty one; the being thoroughly worn out before you are thrown on the scrap heap; the being a force of Nature instead of a feverish selfish little clod of ailments and grievances complaining that the world will not devote itself to making you happy." - George Bernard ShawArianna Huffington an advocate for the things that instigate joy, studied ways that joy can be triggered. In her research, she determined that joy is produced by positive responses that certain neurochemicals in the brain produce during stimulating activities, such as dopamine.  According to Huffington, activities that are able to evoke a positive neurochemical response are producers of joy.

Ingrid Fetell Lee has studied the sources of joy. She wrote the book "Joyful: The Surprising Power of Ordinary Things to Create Extraordinary Happiness", and gave a TED talk on the subject, titled "Where joy hides and how to find it."

See also

 Joie de vivre
 Happiness
 Reward system
 Pleasure

References

Emotions
Happiness